Wayne Fernandes (born December 29, 1978 in Etobicoke, Ontario) is a Canadian field hockey player, who earned his first cap in 1996 against Pakistan.

Fernandes started playing hockey at the age of ten, and made his first international goal in 1999 against Germany in the Sultan Azlan Shah Tournament, in Kuala Lampur. He is a member of a Canadian club called GOA Reds.

Fernandes got the winning goal at the 2007 Pan American Games in Rio de Janeiro, Brazil.

International senior competitions
 2001 — World Cup Qualifier, Edinburgh (8th)
 2002 — Indoor Pan American Cup, Rockville (1st)
 2002 — Commonwealth Games, Manchester (6th)
 2003 — Indoor World Cup, Leipzig (6th)
 2003 — Pan American Games, Santo Domingo (2nd)
 2004 — Olympic Qualifying Tournament, Madrid (11th)
 2004 — Pan Am Cup, London (2nd)
 2006 — Commonwealth Games, Melbourne (9th)
 2007 — Pan American Games, Rio de Janeiro (1st)
 2008 — Olympic Games, Beijing (10th)
 2009 — Pan American Cup, Santiago (1st)
 2010 — 2010 Men's Hockey World Cup, New Delhi, India

External links
 
Wayne Fernandes on Real Champions

1978 births
Canadian sportspeople of Indian descent
Living people
Canadian people of Goan descent
Male field hockey defenders
Male field hockey midfielders
Canadian male field hockey players
Field hockey people from Ontario
Field hockey players at the 2000 Summer Olympics
Field hockey players at the 2002 Commonwealth Games
Field hockey players at the 2006 Commonwealth Games
Field hockey players at the 2007 Pan American Games
Field hockey players at the 2008 Summer Olympics
Olympic field hockey players of Canada
Pan American Games competitors for Canada
Sportspeople from Etobicoke
Commonwealth Games competitors for Canada
Pan American Games medalists in field hockey
Pan American Games gold medalists for Canada
Pan American Games silver medalists for Canada
Medalists at the 2003 Pan American Games
Medalists at the 2007 Pan American Games
2010 Men's Hockey World Cup players